Traiteur may refer to:

Traiteur (faith healer), a Cajun healer
Traiteur (culinary profession), a specific type of French chef

See also
Traitor (disambiguation)